"Free Spirit" is a song by Irish pop duo Jedward. It was released on 17 May 2014 and was announced as the lead single from their upcoming fourth studio album. It is the first single released to have been entirely written and produced by Jedward. The song debuted at number 31 on the Irish singles chart.

Background
On 17 April 2014, Jedward announced details of their fourth studio album, as yet to be released. They revealed that they had written and produced all the songs on the album themselves. They also released the album's lead single, "Free Spirit" on 17 May 2014. The song was inspired by Olympic figure skater Gracie Gold.

Release history

Chart performance

References

2014 singles
2014 songs
Jedward songs
Songs written by Jedward